James Hardy Payne (born 1941 in Lubbock, Texas) is an inactive Senior United States District Judge in Oklahoma, sitting simultaneously on the federal courts for the Eastern, the Northern and the Western districts.

Background, education, and early career

James Hardy Payne was born in 1941 and grew up in Lubbock, Texas. He received his Bachelor of Science degree from the University of Oklahoma in 1963. In 1966, he graduated from the University of Oklahoma College of Law with a Juris Doctor. From 1966 until 1970, he was on active duty in the United States Air Force. He continued as an Air Force reservist from 1975 until 1992.

From 1970 until 1973, Payne worked as an Assistant United States Attorney for the Eastern District of Oklahoma. In 1973, he entered private practice as lawyer for the firm of Sandlin and Payne, working as a partner to Robert Forney Sandlin (1934-2015), in Muskogee, Oklahoma.

In 1988 Payne was appointed by the federal district judges of the United States District Court for the Eastern District of Oklahoma, based in Muskogee, as a United States magistrate judge of that district, to assist the district judges.

US District Judge
On September 4, 2001, President George W. Bush nominated Payne to a seat that simultaneously serves all three of the United States district courts in Oklahoma: the United States District Court for the Eastern District of Oklahoma, the United States District Court for the Northern District of Oklahoma (based in Tulsa) and the United States District Court for the Western District of Oklahoma (based in Oklahoma City). The seat had been vacated by Judge Michael Burrage, who had resigned on March 1, 2001. Payne was confirmed on October 23, 2001, and received his commission the next day. Although Payne was jointly appointed to all three districts, he does not maintain chambers nor does he hear cases in the Western District of Oklahoma. He assumed senior status on August 1, 2017.

Judge Payne served as Chief Judge of the United States District Court for the Eastern District of Oklahoma from 2002 to 2017.

Tenth Circuit nomination under Bush

On September 25, 2005, President Bush nominated Judge Payne to a seat on the United States Court of Appeals for the Tenth Circuit vacated by Judge Stephanie Kulp Seymour, who took senior status on October 16, 2005.

On January 23, 2006, Will Evans of the Center for Investigative Reporting published an article in the online magazine Salon.com reporting that Judge Payne "had issued more than 100 orders in at least 18 cases that involved corporations in which he owned stock", according to review of court and financial records.

Required to file annual financial disclosure forms, judges are expected to regulate themselves. Most district courts have computer systems designed to help monitor such conflicts of interest, but judges must enter their financial information and use it. The clerk's office of neither the Northern nor Eastern District Courts participate in monitoring, as this office does in some other courts.

The article noted that Payne had apparently violated federal law and the official Code of Conduct for U.S. judges, which "explicitly prohibit judges from sitting on cases involving companies in which they own stock—no matter how small their holdings". This prohibition, established as federal law in 1974 by Congress after the Watergate scandal, is intended to uphold the integrity of the judicial system.

Scholars of legal ethics such as professor Leslie W. Abramson, of University of Louisville's law school, and Stephen Gillers, of New York University School of Law, noted that the law was clear and that the judge should have recused himself from these cases where he had a conflict. Professor Steven Lubet, of Northwestern University School of Law, by contrast characterized Payne's actions as "careless mistakes" that were not very significant in terms of the cases or his career. Some lawyers in Oklahoma praised Payne's integrity, and said that most of his actions were "routine and procedural." But some plaintiffs were unhappy to learn of his conflict of interest while presiding over their cases.

According to available financial records, which dated to 1999, Judge Payne also had participated in cases in which he held stock in affected companies while he was serving as a magistrate judge in the Eastern District Court of Oklahoma. This information was not discovered during the review of his nomination as a federal district judge to the seat for the three districts in Oklahoma.

As a result of the Salon article and questions raised, the American Bar Association on February 21 re-evaluated Judge Payne's nomination and downgraded their original judicial rating of him from "well qualified" to "qualified". In addition, the Senate Judiciary Committee and the chief judge of the 10th Circuit said they would investigate Payne's record further.

While saying the "allegations were without merit", Judge Payne withdrew his nomination on March 8, 2006. He offered no further response to the article and refused to respond to the reporter seeking comments. He wrote to President Bush saying that he needed to oversee renovation of information technology systems of the District Courthouse in Muskogee. The allegations concerning financial conflicts of interest created the appearance of "extraordinary circumstances", which would have prevented his confirmation under the terms of the Gang of 14 deal.

On May 4, 2006, President Bush nominated Jerome A. Holmes for the position at the Appeals Court. Holmes was confirmed by the Senate less than three months later.

See also

George W. Bush judicial appointment controversies

References

External links
 
 Department of Justice Resume

1941 births
Living people
Assistant United States Attorneys
University of Oklahoma alumni
University of Oklahoma College of Law alumni
Judges of the United States District Court for the Eastern District of Oklahoma
Judges of the United States District Court for the Northern District of Oklahoma
Judges of the United States District Court for the Western District of Oklahoma
United States district court judges appointed by George W. Bush
21st-century American judges
United States magistrate judges
People from Lubbock, Texas